Oleh Yuriyovych Mozil (born 7 April 1996) is a Ukrainian professional football goalkeeper who currently plays for Metalist 1925 Kharkiv in the Ukrainian Premier League.

Career

Early years
Mozil is a product of Karpaty Lviv academy.

Karpaty Lviv
Starting in summer 2013, after graduating from the academy, he played for the Karpaty Lviv reserves. Mozil never made the debut for the senior team, and in March 2017 went on a half-year loan to Bukovyna Chernivtsi in the Ukrainian First League.

References

External links
 
 

1996 births
Living people
Sportspeople from Lviv
Ukrainian footballers
Association football goalkeepers
Ukraine youth international footballers
FC Karpaty Lviv players
FC Bukovyna Chernivtsi players
FC Lviv players
FC Polissya Zhytomyr players
FC Ahrobiznes Volochysk players
FC Metalist 1925 Kharkiv players
Ukrainian Premier League players
Ukrainian First League players
Ukrainian Second League players